Saint Soldier Rational Public Senior Secondary School (SSRPS) is a senior secondary school in Talwandi Sabo, Bathinda district, Punjab, India. It is located on Natt road in Talwandi Sabo, about 1 km away from the main bus stand. It was established in 1988 in a small building on Natt road. Today it has a full-fledged building with modern computer labs and science labs.

References

High schools and secondary schools in Punjab, India
Bathinda district
Educational institutions established in 1988
1988 establishments in Punjab, India